Raised by Wolves is the debut EP by the indie rock band Voxtrot, released in 2005.

Release
The title track of the EP was initially released as a 7" single by the Portland, Oregon-based independent label Magic Marker Records in 2005, featuring the b-side "They Never Mean What They Say". It subsequently received a compact disc release by Cult Hero Records on July 25, 2005 as a complete EP, featuring a total of four tracks.

Critical response
Brian Howe of Pitchfork awarded the album a 7.8 out of 10 rating, while Rob Bolton of Exclaim! called the EP "a superb debut release." Tim Sendra of AllMusic awarded the EP four-and-a-half out of five stars, comparing it to the work of Belle and Sebastian, The Cure, and The Smiths, adding that it was "a pleasant and breezy introduction to a group for which indie pop fans should have high hopes."

Track listing

Personnel
Musicians
Ramesh Srivastavavocals
Jared Van Fleetguitar
Mitch Calvertguitar
Jason Chronisbass
Matt Simondrums

Technical
Craig Downingproduction
Voxtrotproduction

References

Voxtrot albums
2005 EPs